Opiate Sun is the fifth EP and tenth overall release by Jesu. It was released in America through Mark Kozelek's Caldo Verde label on 27 October 2009. Kozelek had been impressed by Justin Broadrick's performance when he saw him live in San Francisco in 2007, and approached Broadrick about putting a release out on Caldo Verde. Daymare Recordings released the album in Japan on 6 November 2009. The Daymare version of the album contains an exclusive bonus track.

Broadrick had originally mentioned the EP in 2008 but a title and official release date had yet to be announced. It was later announced that Opiate Sun, would be released in July 2009, although that date was later rescheduled.

Initially, the EP was intended to be the first studio recording to include the lineup of Justin Broadrick, Dave Cochrane, and Phil Petrocelli. This lineup was to be featured on two of the four tracks, with the classic lineup of Broadrick, Ted Parsons, and Diarmuid Dalton performing the other two tracks. The released version of the album features Broadrick performing solo.

Track listing
All songs written and performed by Justin K. Broadrick.

 "Losing Streak" – 6:15
 "Opiate Sun" – 7:09
 "Deflated" – 6:59
 "Morning Light" – 5:31
 "Deflated" (Demo Version) – 7:02 †

† indicates a track exclusive to the Japanese edition of the album.

Personnel
Justin Broadrick – guitar, vocals, programming, production
 Nyree Watts – photography
 Brian Azer – sleeve design

Release history

References

Jesu (band) albums
2009 EPs
Post-metal EPs
Caldo Verde Records albums